Mollai (also Romanized as Mollā’ī; also known as Maḩalleh-ye Mollā’ī) is a village in Sigar Rural District, in the Central District of Lamerd County, Fars Province, Iran. At the 2006 census, its population was 99, in 20 families.

References 

Populated places in Lamerd County